The New Czars is a hard rock band from Los Angeles, California.

History 
Singer/guitarist Greg Hampton has worked with and/or produced some of rock music's most notable acts, including Alice Cooper, Lita Ford, Bootsy Collins, and Buckethead. The bass guitarist Paul Ill and the drummer Dave Moreno have built impressive resumes in collaboration with Reeves Gabrels, Bruce Dickinson, Puddle of Mudd, Courtney Love, Pink, and more.

Doomsday Revolution
The New Czar's first album, Doomsday Revolution, was released September on 14, 2010, on Samson Records. About the album, Hampton explained, "You can hear some of the elements of the past records I've been involved in. There's an inherent nature in my writing direction, which stems from my roots. I had been raised in the South in the blues-rock/funky vein, but there are some industrial rock, pop and progressive elements to our music." Produced by Hampton, Doomsday Revolution also includes contributions on the six-string by Adrian Belew. "His sensibilities for progressive and weird music and bizarre pop stuff are certainly on par with my thinking," Hampton said about Belew.

The album earned early praise, when Michael Molenda reviewed it in Guitar Player, writing, "Hybrids of pop and the avant-garde can be inspiring, but when they go bad, it's like Mount Vesuvius bad. But the New Czars nail it. Their music has all the stunning surprises that make great experimental music so thrilling, and they top it off with monstrous grooves and compelling melodies."

Discography

Album
 Doomsday Revolution (2010), Samson Records

References

External links
 The New Czars on Facebook
 Samson Records
 Greg Hampton Productions

Hard rock musical groups from California
Musical groups from Los Angeles